Jérémie Serrandour is a French rapper from Rennes, who has also been known since 2016 by his stage persona Lorenzo. Previously, he was a member of hip hop collective Columbine, under the moniker Larry Garcia. He released his first mixtape as Lorenzo, Empereur du sale, on 31 March 2016. followed by two albums: Rien à branler (2018) and Sex in the City (2019) both topping the French Albums Chart.

Biography 
Before becoming a rapper, Jérémie Serrandour followed a literary terminal with a theater and cinema option at the Lycée Bréquigny in Rennes, where he obtained his baccalaureate diploma in 2013. It was there that he met the members of the hip hop collective Columbine. Under the name of Larry Garcia, he produced most of the music videos for the collective Columbine.

In 2016, Lorenzo began his career by posting his humorous songs on YouTube and decided, following numerous requests from his fans, to release a single disc from the album Empereur du sale which he burned on a CD and decorated with marker. It was sold on eBay and within minutes, the price exceeded 50,000 €. Ebay later removed the CD because of the penis drawn on the cover. He later republished it with the penis blurred.

He works with several labels such as Universal Music and Digital Distribution Serbia. They contributed to his album, Rien à branler, released on February 23, 2018, with the single Carton rouge. The album is certified platinum.

Some of his music videos on YouTube have received millions of views such as Fume à fond, Freestyle du sale and Le Son qui fait plaiz. His single Fume à fond was certified gold two months after its release. In April 2018, the title was certified diamond by the SNEP. He released his third studio album, Sex in the City, on August 23, 2019. The project is certified platinum.

Discography

Albums
Solo albums

Singles

*Did not appear in the official Belgian Ultratop 50 charts, but rather in the bubbling under Ultratip charts.

Other charted songs

*Did not appear in the official Belgian Ultratop 50 charts, but rather in the bubbling under Ultratip charts.

References

Alter egos
French rappers
Living people
1994 births